Justin Varghese (born 10 October 1983) is an Indian music composer, music producer, and sound engineer who works predominantly in the Malayalam cinema industry. He is known his works in Thanneer Mathan Dinangal (2019), Joji (2021) and  Ajagajantharam (2021).

Early life and education
Justin got into music by playing the keyboard in his church choir. Gradually, music became a passion. He then studied sound engineering, programming and music production at the SAE Institute, Chennai. He started his career as a music director. He worked with Bijibal as a music producer in the film "Loud Speaker". Justin also worked as a music producer with Gopi Sundar, Alphones and Bijibal. He became an independent music director with the movie Njandukalude Nattil Oridavela.

Musical career
He started working in the industry as an independent music director with the movie Njandukalude Nattil Oridavela in 2017.

Discography

Awards

References

External links 

 'Malayalam composer Justin Varghese is on a roll with back-to-back releases' 
 'പാട്ടുകാരനെന്നതിനേക്കാള്‍ മ്യൂസിക് ഡയറക്ടര്‍ എന്നറിയപ്പെടുന്നത് തന്നെയാണ് എനിക്കിഷ്ടം'.....
 52nd Kerala State Film Awards announced 
Justin Varghese: Bijibal taught me that the music must always complement the movie 
Justin Varghese: I was overjoyed when Bijibal chettan was impressed with my music 
 The western music somehow blended in with ‘Joji’: Justin Varghese interview 
'ഞണ്ടുകളെ' ഹൃദ്യമാക്കിയ പാട്ടുകളുടെ കൂട്ടുകാരൻ 
 Justin's out of the shell 
Malayalam composer Justin Varghese is on a roll with back-to-back releases 
സെമിനാരിയിലെ സംഗീത പഠനം; ബിജിബാലിന്റെ സഹായി; ഒടുവിൽ ഹിറ്റുകളുടെ അമരക്കാരൻ: ജസ്റ്റിൻ വർഗീസ് അഭിമുഖം...

1983 births
Living people
People from Ernakulam district
Malayalam film score composers
Film musicians from Kerala